Fethi Zghonda is a Tunisian musician, composer, and conductor.

Zghonda served as Secretary-General and Director of Music at the Ministry of Culture and Tourism Tunisia in the 1980s.

References

Tunisian conductors (music)
Tunisian composers
Living people
21st-century conductors (music)
Year of birth missing (living people)